Branimir Hrgota (born 12 January 1993) is a Swedish professional footballer who plays as a striker for and captains 2. Bundesliga club Greuther Fürth.

Club career

Jönköpings Södra IF
Hrgota started his career as a youth player in lower league side IK Tord which he combined with competing in karate. In 2008, he made the decision to give up martial arts and transferred to second division team Jönköpings Södra IF. He made his debut with the first team in 2011 and became the league top scorer that season, netting 18 goals in 25 games. After the season Hrgota received the Player of the Year award from the club supporters. Several clubs were interested in buying him after his successful debut year but Hrgota decided to stay with Jönköpings Södra so that he could finish school in the spring. He went on to score 10 goals in 14 games the following season before moving to Germany in the summer.

Borussia Mönchengladbach
On 4 July 2012, he completed his move to the German club Borussia Mönchengladbach. He made his Bundesliga debut against TSG 1899 Hoffenheim as 74th-minute substitute, replacing Mike Hanke. On 11 May 2013, he made the first eleven for the first time against 1. FSV Mainz 05. He made a big impact on the game scoring a hat-trick. His first ever Bundesliga goal was a converted penalty five minutes before half-time. In the second half he scored two more goals, both with his left foot. After 85 minutes he was substituted for Lukas Rupp. On 15 June 2016, it was announced that Hrgota would join fellow Bundesliga team Eintracht Frankfurt on a three-year contract.

Eintracht Frankfurt
Hrgota scored in his first goal in the game in a 4–3 penalty shoot-out victory against 1. FC Magdeburg in the DFB-Pokal on 21 August 2016. On 20 December 2016, before the winter break, he scored a brace in a 3–0 win over 1. FSV Mainz 05 in the Bundesliga. Despite failing to score in the semi-final cup tie away from home against his former club Borussia Mönchengladbach on 25 April 2017, Hrgota slotted home the winning penalty in the shoot-out which Eintracht Frankfurt won 7–6, having drawn the game 1–1 in normal time.

Greuther Fürth
On 7 August 2019, Hrgota joined Greuther Fürth on a two-year deal.
On 12th of February 2022, Hrgota's opener against Hertha Berlin, after 27 seconds, was the fastest goal in that season.

International career
Hrgota was eligible to play national team football for Sweden, Croatia, and Bosnia and Herzegovina. The Croatia U21 coach Ivo Šušak contacted him during the fall of 2012 in an attempt to bring Hrgota over to his team. However, in the summer of 2014, prior to Sweden's game against Austria in the UEFA European Championship qualifiers, Hrgota was called up to, and accepted to join, the Sweden national team. On March 16, 2022 Hrgota was selected for the World Cup Qualifier playoff 2022 against the Czech Republic and Poland, but did not get playing time.

Personal life
Hrgota was born in Zenica in Bosnia and Herzegovina during the Bosnian War. His parents are ethnic Croats. The family moved to Sweden when Branimir was a child, settling in Jönköping.

Career statistics

Club

International

Honours
Eintracht Frankfurt
 DFB-Pokal: 2017–18

Sweden U21
UEFA European Under-21 Championship: 2015

Individual
Superettan top scorer: 2011

References

External links

1993 births
Living people
Sportspeople from Zenica
Swedish footballers
Sweden international footballers
Sweden under-21 international footballers
Sweden youth international footballers
Bosnia and Herzegovina footballers
Swedish people of Croatian descent
Bosnia and Herzegovina emigrants to Sweden
Croats of Bosnia and Herzegovina
Naturalized citizens of Sweden
Association football forwards
Superettan players
Bundesliga players
2. Bundesliga players
Jönköpings Södra IF players
Borussia Mönchengladbach players
Borussia Mönchengladbach II players
Eintracht Frankfurt players
SpVgg Greuther Fürth players
Swedish expatriate footballers
Bosnia and Herzegovina expatriate footballers
Expatriate footballers in Germany